Dávid Šípoš (born 14 August 1998) is a Slovak footballer who plays for SK Dynamo České Budějovice and previously appeared for Slovak U21 team as a goalkeeper.

Club career

FC Nitra
Šípoš made his Fortuna Liga debut for Nitra against Ružomberok on 26 February 2018. He had kept a clean sheet in the goal-less tie.

International career
Šípoš was first recognised in a Slovak senior national team nomination in September 2022 as an alternate goalkeeper in premier nomination of Francesco Calzona ahead of two 2022–23 UEFA Nations League C fixtures against Azerbaijan and Belarus. He remained absent in any position from subsequent nomination for November friendlies or December prospective national team players' training camp.

References

External links
 FC Nitra official club profile
 
 Futbalnet profile

1998 births
Living people
Sportspeople from Topoľčany
Slovak footballers
Slovak expatriate footballers
Slovakia youth international footballers
Slovakia under-21 international footballers
Association football goalkeepers
FC Nitra players
SK Dynamo České Budějovice players
Slovak Super Liga players
Czech First League players
Expatriate footballers in the Czech Republic
Slovak expatriate sportspeople in the Czech Republic